Ee Snehatheerathu or Saamam is a 2004 Malayalam film directed by Kaviyoor Sivaprasad and written by Ramakrishnan, starring Kunchacko Boban, Umashankari Sumithra, Lal, Nedumudi Venu and Jagathy Sreekumar. Kunchacko Boban won the Special Jury Award at the Kerala State Film Awards for this movie.

Plot 
Viswanathan (Kunchacko Boban) who is idealistic to a fault, suspicious of an evil-doer but kind-hearted Gounder (Lal). Nathan's father Sasthri (Nedumudi Venu) has been enjoying Gounder's largesse but Nathan refuses to believe that it comes no strings attached. It makes him fiercely protective of his mother (Jayaprada) and sister (Suja Karthika).
Nathan teaches at a "parallel college" where his student (Uma Shankari) falls for his charm.

Cast 

 Kunchacko Boban as Vishwanathan
 Umashankari Sumithra as Gayathri
 Jaya Prada as Lekshmi, Vishwanathan's Mother
 Lal as Chinnappa Gounder
 Ravi Menon... Gayathri's Father
 Kannur Sreelatha.... Gayathri's Mother
 Nedumudi Venu as Sashtri,  Vishwanathan's Father
 Jagathy Sreekumar as Parasheri
 Suja Karthika as Divya, Vishwanathan's Sister
 Sudheesh as Ganesh
 Arun as Murugan, Chinnappa Gounder's brother 
 Cochin Haneefa

Soundtrack
All songs were composed by Dr. L. Subramaniam, with lyrics by S. Ramesan Nair.

References

External links 
 

2000s Malayalam-language films
2004 films
Films directed by Kaviyoor Sivaprasad
Films scored by L. Subramaniam